Caroline Garcia (born 16 October 1993) is a French professional tennis player. She has a career high ranking of world No. 4 in singles and world No. 2 in doubles. Garcia is the 2022 WTA Finals singles champion.

She is also a two-time major champion in doubles, having won the French Open women's doubles title in 2016 and 2022 partnering Kristina Mladenovic. The pair were also runners-up at the 2016 US Open, and reached the semifinals at the 2017 Australian Open. Garcia reached her career-high doubles ranking of world No. 2 in October 2016, and has won seven doubles titles on the WTA Tour, including the 2016 Madrid Open. She has also qualified for the WTA Finals on two occasions, and alongside Mladenovic was voted the 2016 WTA Doubles Team of the Year.

Garcia is also a successful singles player. She has won eleven WTA Tour singles titles, including three at the WTA 1000 level: the 2017 Wuhan Open, 2017 China Open and 2022 Cincinnati Open. She achieved her career-high singles ranking of world No. 4 in both September 2018 and November 2022, the latter after winning the 2022 WTA Finals.

Garcia has represented France in the Billie Jean King Cup since 2013, and was part of the team that won the title in 2019. She won a Fed Cup Heart Award in 2016 for her role in leading France to its first final in eleven years. She has also twice competed for France at the Olympics.

Personal life
Caroline Garcia was born in Saint-Germain-en-Laye, in the Yvelines département, but moved with her family to Bron, a suburb of Lyon, shortly after. She is the only child of Louis-Paul, a former sales manager whose family originates from the Spanish Costa Blanca region, and Mylène.

Until 2021, Garcia was trained by her father Louis-Paul.

In 2023, Garcia opened up about her struggles with bulimia nervosa following a foot injury and a loss of form. She stated that conversations with family and friends, as well as a break from tennis, helped her to overcome bulimia, and to develop a healthy relationship with food once again.

Career

Juniors
As a junior, Garcia reached the semifinals of the Australian Open, French Open and Wimbledon, and the finals of the US Open, losing to Grace Min, all in 2011. She reached her highest junior ranking of 5, on 12 December 2011.

2011
At the Australian Open, she earned a wild card and beat Varvara Lepchenko in the first round in her first appearance in the main draw of a WTA tournament. However, she lost to Ayumi Morita in the second round.

Garcia made entry into the French Open as a wildcard. She played Zuzana Ondrášková and defeated her in straight sets. In the second round, she had a 6–3, 4–1, 15–0 lead against former No. 1, Maria Sharapova, who then won eleven games in a row. Garcia garnered a lot of respect for her talent. Andy Murray said the following via his Twitter account: "The girl Sharapova is playing is going to be number one in the world one day... what a player".

2013

At the Australian Open, Garcia lost in the first round to No. 47 Elena Vesnina. She then beat qualifier Yuliya Beygelzimer, before losing to eventual champion, Serena Williams, at the French Open. She qualified for Wimbledon. This marks the first Grand Slam for which she qualified; she received a wild card for the previous five. Caroline beat Zheng Jie in the first round, before losing again to Serena Williams in the second round.

She was ranked high enough to gain direct entry to the main draw of the US Open, and beat American wild card Shelby Rogers in the first round, before losing to 30th seed Laura Robson of Great Britain. Her first round win meant that Garcia reached the world's top 70 for the first time.

2014: First WTA Tour titles
At the Sony Open, Garcia was the only player to win a set against Serena Williams, as Williams was on her way toward winning her seventh title and setting the record for the most titles held by a man or woman at the tournament. At the Copa Claro Colsanitas in Bogotá, Colombia, Garcia won her maiden WTA Tour singles title, beating the defending champion and former world No. 1, Jelena Janković, winning in straight sets.

At the Madrid Open in May, Garcia reached the quarterfinals of any Premier event for the first time, defeating Angelique Kerber in the first round after the German retired with a lower back injury, receiving a walkover from Maria Kirilenko after the Russian withdrew with a wrist injury, and then defeating tenth seed Sara Errani in three sets in the third round. She eventually lost to third seed Agnieszka Radwańska in the quarterfinals in three sets. Garcia lost in the first round of the French Open to Ana Ivanovic.

Garcia made the third round of the Wimbledon, eventually losing to Ekaterina Makarova. She lost early at the US Open to American Nicole Gibbs. Garcia rebounded at the Wuhan Open, defeating Venus Williams and Agnieszka Radwańska back to back, in final-set tiebreaks. She also defeated American CoCo Vandeweghe in straight sets to reach the quarterfinals, where she was defeated by eventual champion Petra Kvitová. Despite the loss, Garcia moved up to a career high of No. 36 in the rankings.

2015: Two WTA singles finals
Garcia began her season at the Brisbane International where she lost in the first round to No. 3 seed Angelique Kerber. She then played at the Australian Open where she beat No. 27 seed Svetlana Kuznetsova and Stefanie Vögele before losing to Eugenie Bouchard in the third round. After her campaign, Garcia joined France's Fed Cup team for their tie against Italy. Despite losing to Sara Errani, Garcia managed to grab a win as she beat Camila Giorgi in three sets as her country advanced to the semifinals.

At the Dubai Tennis Championships, Garcia lost in the second round to Agnieszka Radwańska after beating qualifier Arina Rodionova in straight sets. She followed that with a run to the finals at the Mexican Open, receiving a walkover from Maria Sharapova in the semis as the Russian withdrew due to illness. She then lost to Timea Bacsinszky. Garcia also reached the finals of the Monterrey Open where she also was a runner-up to Bacsinszky. She grabbed her first win over former world No. 1, Ana Ivanovic, en route.

After receiving a first round-bye at Indian Wells, Garcia beat qualifier Polona Hercog before grabbing her second straight win over Ivanovic in three sets. She then lost to eventual semifinalist Sabine Lisicki.

2016: French Open champion in doubles

Garcia represented France at the 2016 Hopman Cup alongside Kenny de Schepper. She was undefeated in her singles matches, beating Heather Watson, Sabine Lisicki, and eventual champion Daria Gavrilova. Garcia and de Schepper were beaten in all of their mixed doubles matches. At the Sydney International, Garcia defeated Kristina Mladenovic, but lost in three sets to eventual semifinalist Simona Halep. She then fell short in the first round of the Australian Open, losing to Barbora Strýcová in straight sets.

At the Fed Cup, however, Garcia rebounded and helped France in their tie against Italy, earning singles wins over Sara Errani and Camila Giorgi. In her next tournament, the Dubai Tennis Championships, she lost her singles semifinal match, defeating Anna Karolína Schmiedlová, Carla Suárez Navarro and Andrea Petkovic en route. Two weeks later, she reached her second WTA Tour singles semifinals of the year at the tournament in Monterrey, losing her semifinal match to Heather Watson. Garcia then lost in her opening match in Indian Wells to Christina McHale. Her next tournament was the Miami Open, where she beat Mirjana Lučić-Baroni and Andrea Petkovic before losing in three sets to eventual finalist Svetlana Kuznetsova.

She then played in Charleston, losing her first-round match to Irina-Camelia Begu. However, Garcia won the doubles title alongside Kristina Mladenovic.

Playing for France in the Fed Cup semifinal, Garcia lost her first match against Kiki Bertens in straight sets, but managed to beat Arantxa Rus. France eventually won the tie after the doubles match, in which Garcia once again played with Mladenovic. Her next tournament was the Porsche Tennis Grand Prix, where, despite another first-round defeat in the singles to Monica Niculescu, she won another title in doubles with Mladenovic after beating top-seeds Martina Hingis and Sania Mirza in the final.

In May, Garcia won her first Premier Mandatory/Premier-5 doubles title at the Madrid Open, partnering Mladenovic. In the same month, Garcia won the Internationaux de Strasbourg singles title by defeating Mirjana Lučić-Baroni in straight sets in the final, becoming only the third Frenchwoman to win that title since it became a WTA event in 1987.

At the French Open, Garcia won the women's doubles event partnering Mladenovic, beating Ekaterina Makarova and Elena Vesnina in the final. It was the first Grand Slam women's doubles crown for Garcia and Mladenovic and they became the first all-French pair to win the French Open women's doubles title since Gail Chanfreau and Françoise Dürr in 1971.

On 19 June, Garcia won her second WTA singles title of 2016 and her first on grass by beating Anastasija Sevastova in straight sets in the final of the inaugural Mallorca Open. She had defeated a pair of former Wimbledon singles semifinalists in Ana Ivanovic and Kirsten Flipkens to reach the final. On 20 June, she returned to No. 32 of the singles rankings and replaced Kristina Mladenovic as the French singles No. 1.

Garcia participated in both the women's singles and women's doubles of the 2016 Summer Olympics. Garcia and Kristina Mladenovic, seeded No. 2, lost in the first round of the women's doubles.

At the US Open, Garcia was seeded No. 25 in singles. She reached the third round of the draw, defeating Kiki Bertens and Kateřina Siniaková before falling to the fourth-seeded Agnieszka Radwańska. As a result, Garcia reached a career-high ranking of 24. In the doubles event, Garcia yet again partnered with Mladenovic. The Frenchwomen were the No. 1 seed of the event. They reached the final, where they were defeated by Bethanie Mattek-Sands and Lucie Šafářová. As a result of reaching the final, Garcia and Mladenovic qualified for the WTA Finals as second doubles team.

Garcia kicked off the Asian swing at the Wuhan Open. She was scheduled to play singles at the Guangzhou Open one week earlier, but withdrew before the tournament started. In Wuhan, Garcia played in both singles and doubles. In singles, she was defeated in the second round by No. 8 seed Madison Keys. In doubles, Garcia and Mladenovic, the No. 1 seeds, lost their opening second round to Christina McHale and Peng Shuai. Next, at the China Open, Garcia reached the third round of the singles draw, before falling to Daria Gavrilova. In doubles, she was once again top-seeded with Mladenovic. The French team fought their way to the final, defeating third-seeds, Chan Hao-ching and Chan Yung-jan, in the semifinals. This was Garcia and Mladenovic's eighth final together. They would end up losing to Mattek-Sands and Šafářová, the US Open champions.

Garcia ended her run in Asia at the Hong Kong Open, where she was seeded No. 5 in singles. She passed the first round before losing to her doubles rival, Bethanie Mattek-Sands, in the second round.
She also played singles at her last regular-season tournament of the year, the Luxembourg Open, where she was seeded fourth. She had a hard-fought match against Anett Kontaveit, and just barely won. She was then defeated by Andrea Petkovic.

Garcia and Mladenovic received the WTA Award for Best Doubles Team of the Year shortly before the start of the WTA Finals. Garcia also won the Heart Award for the Fed Cup World Group semifinals stage. At the Finals, Garcia and Mladenovic started strong, defeating Julia Görges and Karolína Plíšková in the quarterfinals. However, in the semifinals, they were once again defeated by their rivals, Bethanie Mattek-Sands and Lucie Šafářová. Garcia and Mladenovic missed the chance to become the WTA year-end doubles world number-ones.

Garcia made a last-minute appearance at the WTA Elite Trophy. She was originally one place short of qualifying, but was able to join the tournament when Venus Williams withdrew. She played in the Azalea Group against Johanna Konta and Samantha Stosur. Garcia won her first match against Stosur, but lost her second match against Konta, the top-seed, and thus did not reach the semifinals. However, she walked away with a year-end ranking of 23, her best ranking yet.

In the Fed Cup final in November against the Czech Republic, Garcia defeated two-time Wimbledon champion Petra Kvitová, then upset US Open finalist and Czech No. 1, Karolína Plíšková. Unfortunately, Garcia and Mladenovic then lost their doubles rubber against Pliskova and Strýcová, which meant that the Czech won the Fed Cup final 3–2.

In December, Garcia and Mladenovic were named the doubles ITF World Champions of 2016.

2017: French Open quarterfinal, Asian Premier double champion, top 10
During the off-season, Garcia announced that she would not play in the 2017 Fed Cup, explaining that she wanted to focus on her singles career.

Garcia's first tournament of the year was the Australian Open, in which she was the 21st seed. In the first round of the singles event, she defeated Kateryna Bondarenko in straight sets. In the second round, she faced countrywoman Océane Dodin. Garcia lost the first set, but rallied back to win the match. She then lost in the third round to Barbora Strýcová. In the doubles event, Garcia paired up with Kristina Mladenovic, the French duo being the top seeds of the tournament. The pair won their first three matches to advance to the quarterfinals, in which they defeated Ashleigh Barty and Casey Dellacqua. Garcia and Mladenovic then lost in the semifinals to Andrea Hlaváčková and Peng Shuai.

Garcia moved on to the Taiwan Open, in which she was seeded No. 3. She won her opening match against Marina Erakovic, setting up an encounter with Mandy Minella in the second round, to whom she lost in straight sets. At the Qatar Open, Garcia won her first round match against qualifier Madison Brengle before falling to No. 2 seed Karolína Plíšková in straight sets in the second round. At the Dubai Tennis Championships, Garcia was seeded No. 15. She defeated Johanna Larsson in the first round, but lost to the 2016 Olympics singles gold medalist Monica Puig in the second round. Garcia's poor form continued in Kuala Lumpur, where seeded No. 3, she lost in the first round to the Russian qualifier Anna Kalinskaya.

Wanting to focus on her singles success, Garcia ended her partnership with Mladenovic. However, she still played doubles at the Indian Wells Open, partnering Karolína Plíšková instead. In the BNP Paribas Open singles, Garcia received a bye into the second round, as she was seeded No. 21. She defeated lucky loser Evgeniya Rodina, upset No. 11th seed Johanna Konta in the third round before losing to eventual finalist Svetlana Kuznetsova in the fourth round. Prior to the Miami Open, Garcia lost her status as the top-ranked Frenchwoman in singles to Mladenovic. In that tournament, Garcia was seeded No. 21 and lost her opening match to Peng Shuai in the second round. As the No. 3 seed at the Monterrey Open, Garcia reached the semifinals where she lost to eventual champion Anastasia Pavlyuchenkova.

Garcia began her clay season at the Madrid Open where she lost in the first round to the qualifier Wang Qiang. She also had an early exit at her next event, falling in the second round of the Italian Open to Daria Gavrilova, having beaten Donna Vekić in the first round. She was also beaten by Gavrilova in the semi-finals of the Internationaux de Strasbourg.

At the French Open, Garcia beat Nao Hibino, Chloé Paquet, Hsieh Su-wei and Alizé Cornet to reach her first Grand Slam singles quarterfinal, where she lost to the No. 2 seed Karolína Plíšková. Garcia reached a career-high ranking of No. 21 in the singles rankings.

Garcia continued her good form at Wimbledon by reaching the fourth round for the first time, where she lost to the No. 6 seed, Johanna Konta, in three tight sets. She then reached the singles semifinals in Mallorca and Båstad and the singles quarterfinals at the Rogers Cup and Pan Pacific Open.

Garcia won her first career Premier-5 singles title at the Wuhan Open. It was the biggest singles title won by any French female player since Marion Bartoli won Wimbledon in 2013. At Wuhan, the unseeded Garcia defeated the No. 12 seed Angelique Kerber in the first round, registered her first victory of 2017 over a player ranked in the top 10 of the WTA singles rankings by beating the No. 7 seed Dominika Cibulková in the third round, and went on to defeat the unseeded Ashleigh Barty in three sets in the final. Garcia reached a career-high of No. 15 in the WTA singles rankings.

At the China Open, Garcia progressed to the quarterfinals after defeating Elise Mertens and Cornet. She then saved a match point in her three-set victory over the third seed Elina Svitolina to reach the semifinals. She defeated Petra Kvitová in straight sets to reach her second consecutive WTA final, where she beat the newly crowned No. 1, Simona Halep, in straight sets, to win her first Premier-Mandatory title, becoming the first WTA player to win the Wuhan and China Open in the same year. After Johanna Konta pulled out of the Kremlin Cup, Garcia was confirmed to be the final qualifier for the WTA finals. Garcia lost her first match in the WTA Finals to Halep in straight sets, but then beat both Svitolina and Caroline Wozniacki in three sets to reach the semifinals, where she was defeated by Venus Williams.

2018: Two Major fourth rounds, world No. 4
After starting her season in Brisbane, Garcia played at the Australian Open. The eighth seed, she advanced to the fourth round for the first time in her career before losing to Madison Keys.

Garcia reached the fourth round of her home Slam at the 2018 French Open.
She also reached the quarterfinals in Dubai and Doha, semifinals in Stuttgart and Madrid, as well as quarterfinals in Rome, Montreal, New Haven, and Tokyo. She reached a career-high ranking of world No. 4 on 10 September 2018 following her third round showing at the 2018 US Open (tennis).

She finished the year ranked No. 19 in the singles rankings.

2019: Fed Cup champion
Garcia helped France win the 2019 Fed Cup. She reunited with Mladenovic to clinch the final doubles match against Ashleigh Barty and Sam Stosur of Australia.

2020: Mixed results, French Open fourth round
Garcia began the 2020 tennis season with average results, losing in the second round of the Australian Open to Ons Jabeur. However, at the US Open, Garcia reached the third round, beating top-seeded Karolína Plíšková in the second round.

She also achieved positive results at the postponed French Open, beating 17th seed Anett Kontaveit, Aliaksandra Sasnovich, and 16th seed Elise Mertens en route to the fourth round. Garcia was defeated by third seed Elina Svitolina in the fourth round. Garcia's best performance of 2020 was a quarterfinal finish at the Lyon Open, losing to the fifth seed Alison Van Uytvanck, in straight sets.

2021: Loss of form, out of top 70

Garcia started her 2021 season at the first edition of the Gippsland Trophy. Seeded 12th, she reached the third round where she lost to seventh seed and eventual champion, Elise Mertens. At the Australian Open, she was defeated in the second round by third seed, 2019 champion, and eventual champion, Naomi Osaka. Seeded 10th at the first edition of the Phillip Island Trophy, she was eliminated in the first round by Misaki Doi. In Adelaide, she was beaten in her first-round match by Anastasija Sevastova.

Seeded third at the Lyon Open, Garcia lost in the second round to qualifier and eventual finalist, Viktorija Golubic. At the Dubai Tennis Championships, she beat Angelique Kerber in the first round. She was defeated in the third round by tenth seed Elise Mertens. In Miami, she faced third seed Simona Halep in the second round. She pushed Halep to three sets but ended up losing the match.

In May 2021, Garcia announced her new coach as Gabriel Urpí, thus ending a partnership with her father and long-time coach Louis-Paul Garcia. She started her clay-court season at the Italian Open. She was eliminated in the second round by Veronika Kudermetova. Seeded eighth at the first edition of the Emilia-Romagna Open in Parma, she reached the quarterfinals where she was beaten by Kateřina Siniaková. At the Internationaux de Strasbourg, she lost in the second round to fifth seed and eventual champion, Barbora Krejčíková. At Roland Garros, she beat last year quarterfinalist, Laura Siegemund, in the first round. She was defeated in the second round by Polona Hercog.

Kicking off her grass-court season at the Birmingham Classic, Garcia lost in the second round to eighth seed Marie Bouzková.

Her last match was at the Indian Wells Open in the beginning of October where she lost to Coco Gauff in the second round. She finished the season ranked No. 74 in the singles rankings.

She started working with a new coach Bertrand Perret in December.

2022: WTA Finals champion, US Open semifinal, return to world No. 4
At the French Open, she reached the final as a wildcard pair with compatriot Kristina Mladenovic.
She won her second French Open defeating Jessica Pegula and Coco Gauff in the final.

She secured her eighth career singles title in the lead up to Wimbledon at the Bad Homburg Open in the two longest matches of the tournament, over Alizé Cornet in the semifinals (2:45) and Bianca Andreescu in the final (2:42).
At Wimbledon, she reached the fourth round only for a second time at this major.

At the Poland Open, Garcia upset the world No. 1, Iga Swiatek, in the quarterfinals for her first win against a world No. 1 in ten attempts, ending Swiatek's 18 match win streak on clay in the process. She went on to win the tournament, defeating Ana Bogdan, in straight sets in the final, for her ninth title and second in two months.

At the Cincinnati Open, she reached the quarterfinals of a WTA 1000 for the first time in four years, since the Canadian Open in 2018, as a qualifier, defeating world No. 3 Maria Sakkari, her second top-3 win of 2022 and Elise Mertens. Next she defeated world No. 8 and seventh seed Jessica Pegula to reach her first WTA 1000 semifinal since Madrid in 2018, becoming the first qualifier to advance to the semifinals at this tournament since Akgul Amanmuradova in 2007. With her win over sixth seed Aryna Sabalenka she became the first qualifier to ever advance to a WTA 1000 final since the tier was created in 2009. She won her tenth title defeating Petra Kvitová in straight sets. As a result, she moved back into the top 20, at world No. 17.

Garcia entered the US Open as the 17th seed, on an eight-match winning streak dating back to the first round of qualifying in Cincinnati. She defeated lucky loser Kamilla Rakhimova, Anna Kalinskaya, 2019 champion Bianca Andreescu, and Alison Riske-Amritraj in the first four rounds to advance to the quarterfinals for the first time in her career at the US Open and the second time at a major. She defeated 12th seed Coco Gauff in the quarterfinals, but lost to fifth seed Ons Jabeur in straight sets in her first major semifinal, snapping a 13-match winning streak. As a result, she re-entered the top 10 in singles on 12 September 2022. In doubles, she reached the quarterfinals with compatriot Mladenovic.

She qualified for the WTA Finals by defeating Rebecca Marino in the first round of Guadalajara Open. One week before the start of WTA Finals, Bertrand Perret quit being her coach. Seeded sixth, she was placed in Group Tracy Austin of the WTA Finals. She defeated Maria Sakkari in the semifinal in straight sets. She proceeded to win the biggest title of her career defeating Aryna Sabalenka also in straight sets and moved back to her career-high world No. 4 in the singles rankings.

2023: Two finals
She was the top seed at the Lyon Open and the Monterrey Open but lost in the final respectively to Alycia Parks and Donna Vekic.

Playing style
Garcia is an offensive baseliner, with consistent and powerful groundstrokes, and a strong service game. Her forehand is her stronger wing, and she can hit many clean winners off it. She also possesses a consistent and strong two-handed backhand. She also has a strong first and second serve, known for its accuracy. She served the ninth most aces in 2016, with 218. Her doubles success means she also has a solid net game, although this isn't frequently seen in her singles game. She has good movement and footwork around the court, which help her with hitting her groundstrokes effectively.

Endorsements
Garcia is sponsored by Yonex for her clothing, by New Balance for her shoes, and by Yonex for her racquets. She uses the Yonex VCORE SV 100 racquet. Garcia is also a spokeswoman for Sothys, a French cosmetics company.

Career statistics

Grand Slam tournament performance timelines

Singles

Doubles

Grand Slam finals

Doubles: 3 (2 titles, 1 runner-up)

Year-end championship finals

Singles: 1 (1 title)

References

External links

 

1993 births
Living people
French female tennis players
French people of Spanish descent
Hopman Cup competitors
Tennis players from Lyon
Sportspeople from Saint-Germain-en-Laye
French Open champions
Grand Slam (tennis) champions in women's doubles
Olympic tennis players of France
Tennis players at the 2016 Summer Olympics
Tennis players at the 2020 Summer Olympics
ITF World Champions
21st-century French women